Manoranjan Hazra was an Indian politician. He was elected to the Lok Sabha, lower house of the Parliament of India from Arambagh in West Bengal as a member of the Communist Party of India (Marxist).

References

External links
Official biographical sketch in Parliament of India website

1920 births
Possibly living people
India MPs 1971–1977
Communist Party of India (Marxist) politicians from West Bengal